Alice Clerici (born 15 June 1996) is an Italian épée fencer.

She participated at the 2019 World Fencing Championships, winning a bronze medal.

References

External links
 

1996 births
Living people
Italian épée fencers
Italian female fencers
Fencers of Fiamme Oro
World Fencing Championships medalists
21st-century Italian women